Flammulina filiformis is a species of agaric (gilled mushroom) in the family Physalacriaceae. It is well known for its role in Japanese cuisine, where it is called enokitake (榎茸, エノキタケ)
and is widely cultivated in East Asia. Until recently, the species was considered to be conspecific with the European Flammulina velutipes, but DNA sequencing has shown that the two are distinct.

Taxonomy
Flammulina filiformis was originally described from China in 2015 as a variety of F. velutipes, based on ITS sequences. Further molecular research using a combination of different sequences has shown that F. filiformis and F. velutipes are distinct and should be recognized as separate species.

Vernacular names
The names enokitake (榎茸、エノキタケ), enokidake (榎茸、エノキダケ) and enoki (榎、エノキ) are derived from the Japanese language. In Mandarin Chinese, the mushroom is called  ("gold needle mushroom") or 金菇 (jīngū, "gold mushroom"). In India it is called futu, in Korean, it is called paengi beoseot (팽이버섯) which means "mushroom planted near catalpa", and nấm kim châm in Vietnamese.

Description
Basidiocarps are agaricoid and grow in clusters. Individual fruitbodies are up to 50mm (2 in) tall, the cap convex at first, becoming flat when expanded, up to 45mm (1.75 in) across. The cap surface is smooth, viscid when damp, ochraceous yellow to yellow-brown. The lamellae (gills) are cream to yellowish white. The stipe (stem) is smooth, pale yellow at the apex, yellow-brown to dark brown towards the base, lacking a ring. The spore print is white, the spores (under a microscope) smooth, inamyloid, ellipsoid to cylindical, c. 5 to 7 by 3 to 3.5μm.

There is a significant difference in appearance between wild and cultivated basidiocarps. Cultivated enokitake are not exposed to light, resulting in white or pallid fruitbodies with long stipes and small caps.

Habitat and distribution
The fungus is found on dead wood of Betula platyphylla, Broussonetia papyrifera, Dipentodon sinicus, Neolitsea sp., Salix spp, and other broad-leaved trees. It grows naturally in China, Korea, and Japan.

Cultivation and food

Flammulina filiformis has been cultivated in China since 800 AD. Commercial production in China was estimated at 1.57 million tonnes per annum in 2010, with Japan producing an additional 140,000 tonnes per annum. The fungus can be cultivated on a range of simple, lignocellulosic substrates including sawdust, wheat straw, and paddy straw. Enokitake are typically grown in the dark, producing pallid fruitbodies having long and narrow stipes with undeveloped caps. Exposure to light results in more normal, short-stiped, coloured fruitbodies.

Cultivated F. filiformis is sold both fresh and canned. The fungus has a crisp texture and can be refrigerated for approximately one week. It is a common ingredient for soups, especially in East Asian cuisine, but can be used for salads and other dishes.

See also

Medicinal mushrooms
Shiitake

References

External links

Fungi of Asia
Edible fungi
Fungi in cultivation
Chinese edible mushrooms
Fungi described in 2015
Physalacriaceae
Japanese cuisine terms
Medicinal fungi